Ginter Smuts (born 7 September 1998) is a South African rugby union player for the  in the Currie Cup and the Rugby Challenge. His regular position is scrum-half.

References

South African rugby union players
Living people
1998 births
Rugby union scrum-halves
Pumas (Currie Cup) players
Lions (United Rugby Championship) players
Golden Lions players